XHV-FM is a Spanish news / talk radio station in Chihuahua, Chihuahua, owned and operated by Radio Fórmula.

History
XEV-AM 1390 received its concession on May 4, 1977. It was owned by Ernesto Chapa Terrazas. In the 1990s, it moved to 880 kHz and raised its power from 1,000 to 5,000 watts.

XHV formerly broadcast on AM as XEV-AM 880. The AM-FM migration changed the station's call sign to XHV-FM, which had been the callsign of 102.5 FM in Mexico City from 1967 to 1991.

External links

References

News and talk radio stations in Mexico
Radio stations in Chihuahua
Mass media in Chihuahua City
Radio Fórmula